Saddle Island is  long and  wide, situated on the south side of the entrance to Wilson Harbour on the west coast of South Georgia Island in the Antarctic.

Location

See also
Composite Antarctic Gazetteer
List of Antarctic and sub-Antarctic islands
List of Antarctic islands north of 60° S

Map
South Georgia. Scale 1:200000 topographic map. DOS 610 Series. Directorate of Overseas Surveys, Tolworth, UK, 1958.

References

External links
Saddle Island — Agreement on the Conservation of Albatrosses and Petrels (ACAP) Data Portal

Islands of South Georgia
Seabird colonies